Ptericoptus dorsalis is a species of beetle in the family Cerambycidae. It was described by Audinet-Serville in 1835. It is known from Brazil.

References

Ptericoptus
Beetles described in 1835